Daly River is a town adjacent to the Daly River in the Northern Territory of Australia.  At the 2006 census, Daly River had a population of 468.  The town is part of the Victoria Daly Region local government area. The area is popular for recreational fishing, being regarded as one of the best places to catch Barramundi in Australia.

History

Early settlement and mission
The traditional owners of the area are the Mulluk-Mulluk people who live both in Nauiyu and at Wooliana downstream from the community.

European settlement of Daly River began in 1865 with the arrival of Boyle Travers Finniss, the first Premier of South Australia and the first Government Resident of the Northern Territory.  Finniss named the river after Sir Dominick Daly, the Governor of South Australia, since the Northern Territory was at that time part of South Australia.  The region lay untouched by Europeans until 1882 when copper was discovered.

Daly River town was the scene of some particularly bloody exchanges between the local Aborigines and the miners.  In 1884 three miners were killed.  The miners in the town wreaked vengeance on the local Aborigines out of proportion to the perceived crime.  A year later, probably aware of the tensions in the area, the Society of Jesus order of the Roman Catholic Church established a mission in the town, introducing Christianity and farming techniques to the local Aboriginal population. The original mission endured until 1899, when following a significant flood the missionaries were withdrawn.

In 1954, contact between traditional Malak Malak elders and the then bishop of Darwin led to the mission being reestablished. In 1955, the church purchased  of land and the Missionaries of the Sacred Heart helped to establish a school and a clinic for the community. The mission was later renamed Nauiyu and with the exception of the church, convent, school and associated residences transferred to community ownership. Due to the influence of the mission in the town, 75% percent of the population identify as Roman Catholics.

Through the twentieth century there were a number of attempts to settle the town without real success.  In 1911 the Commonwealth Government tried to convince people to move to the town.  By the 1920s there were plans for crops of peanuts and tobacco which came to nothing. Cashews and sugar cane were also planted unsuccessfully.  In 1967 the Tipperary Land Corporation cleared large tracts of land around the settlement and started growing sorghum but the operation was closed down in 1973.

Floods
Like other rivers of the Top End, the Daly is prone to seasonal flooding and this has had a significant impact on the small community throughout its history. Major flood events devastated the town in 1899 and 1957, causing widespread property damage. On 28 January 1998, a major natural disaster saw every building in the town inundated and the entire population airlifted to Batchelor during the emergency evacuation.

Economy and infrastructure
Daly River is considered a remote community, and is primarily accessed via the Daly River Road which was sealed as far as the river crossing in 2007, providing all weather access to Darwin. A sealed airstrip at Nauiyu provides for charter and medical evacuation flights, however there are no scheduled air services to the airport, or aircraft regularly based in the town.

Other public facilities at Daly River include a public library, swimming pool, school and health clinic. There is a Catholic church, St Francis Xavier located in Nauiyu. The Victoria Daly Regional Council maintains a regional office in the community, contributing more than 40 jobs to the local economy. Public Administration is by far the largest employment industry, accounting for over half of the workforce.

The town and surrounding district are served by a modern police station, built in 1994. Two members of the Northern Territory Police are based here.

Attractions
Today the town has a pub with  motel units, a police station, and a  number of caravan parks. It is located on the banks of the river a couple of kilometres from the Daly River Crossing, now by sealed road  from the main tourist route, the Stuart Highway. The settlement is a centre for visitors to explore the Daly River Nature Park and fishermen after barramundi. The park is home to saltwater crocodiles, reptiles, spiders, cockatoos, wild pigs, feral Water Buffalo, mangroves, giant bamboos, pandanus and Kapok trees.

Just before entering the town there is a turnoff to the Nauiyu Aboriginal Community, home to the Roman Catholic Mission and Merrepen Arts Centre where local art is sold. Merrepen Arts has become a well known art centre in the top end. In recent years a number of artists from the area have become nationally famous including Marita Sambono and Kieren Karritpul. The art centre and workshops are open to the public on weekdays.

See also

 Daly Waters, Northern Territory
 Daly languages

References

External links
Katherine Regional Tourist Authority
Nauiyu Nambiyu Community Government Council
Merrepen Arts Centre

Towns in the Northern Territory
1865 establishments in Australia
Populated places established in 1865
Aboriginal communities in the Northern Territory
Australian Aboriginal missions
Places in the unincorporated areas of the Northern Territory
Victoria Daly Region